Chantal Beaugeant (born 16 February 1961 at Saint Etienne) is a former French athlete, who specialized in the combined events.

Biography  

She won four French National Athletic titles, three in the heptathlon in 1984, 1985 and 1988, and one in the 400 hurdles in 1986.

She  six times improved the French record in the heptathlon, bringing it to 6,702 pts on 18 June 1988 at the Hypo-Meeting.

She participated in the heptathlon in the 1984 Olympics and 1988 Olympics but did not finish the competition either time. In 1988 in Seoul, she reached the semifinals of the 400m hurdles. In 1986, she placed 8th in the heptathlon at the European Championships at Stuttgart.

Prize list  
 French Championships in Athletics   :  
 winner of the heptathlon 1984,  1985 and 1988.   
 winner of the 400m hurdles in 1986

Records

Notes and references

External links  
 Olympic profile for Chantal Beaugeant at sports-reference.com

1961 births
Living people
French female athletes
Athletes (track and field) at the 1984 Summer Olympics
Athletes (track and field) at the 1988 Summer Olympics
Olympic athletes of France
French heptathletes
Sportspeople from Saint-Étienne